Askeaton may refer to:

Askeaton, a town in County Limerick, Ireland
Askeaton, Wisconsin, an unincorporated community
Askeaton (Parliament of Ireland constituency), a constituency in the Irish House of Commons.